Qiaogou Subdistrict is a subdistrict in Baota District, Yan'an, Shaanxi Province, China.

History 
Qiaogou as an administrative unit dates back to 1972, when the Qiao'ergou People's Commune was established.

Qiao'ergou was changed to a township in 1984, when people's communes were abolished in China.

In 1998, Qiao'ergou Township was upgraded to become a town, and its name was changed to Qiaogou.

In 2015, Qiaogou was upgraded from a town to a subdistrict.

Geography 
Qiaogou Subdistrict is located in the central western portion of Baota District, near the urban core of Yan'an. The Yan River flows through the subdistrict.

Administrative divisions 
Qiaogou Subdistrict has jurisdiction over 6 residential communities and 15 administrative villages.

 Xiangyang Community
 Dongyuan Community
 Ershilipu Community
 Luojiaping Community
 Fangta Community
 Qiaogou Community
 Yinjiagou Village
 Luojiaping Village
 Liushudian Village
 Wangchagou Village
 Yandonggou Village
 Liuwanjiagou Village
 Ershilipu Village
 Shilipu Village
 Qiaogou Village
 Dongsheng Village
 Nanzhaibian Village
 Zezigou Village
 Fangta Village
 Renjiayaoce Village
 Zhujiawa Village

Transportation 
National Highway 210 passes through Qiaogou Subdistrict.

Attractions 
Attractions within Qiaogou Subdistrict include Wangjiaping Memorial Hall, the Yangjialing Revolutionary Site, the Qiaogou Lu Xun Art School Site, and Dufu Temple.

See also
List of township-level divisions of Shaanxi

References

Subdistricts of the People's Republic of China
Township-level divisions of Shaanxi
Baota District